David Joseph Buggy (born 20 March 1975) is an Irish former hurler. At club level he played with Erin's Own and was also a member of the Kilkenny senior hurling team. He usually lined out in the forwards.

Career

O'Shea first came to prominence at juvenile and underage levels with the Erin's Own club in Castlecomer before quickly joining the club's top adult teams as a dual player. He enjoyed County Intermediate Championship successes in 2003 and 2008. Buggy first appeared on the inter-county scene with the Kilkenny minor team and scored 1-03 against Galway in the 1993 All-Ireland final. His subsequent tenure with the Kilkenny under-21 team saw defeat by Tipperary in the 1995 All-Ireland final. Buggy was drafted onto the Kilkenny senior hurling team by manager Ollie Walsh in 1994, however, he remained on the fringes of the team for a number of seasons without making a breakthrough. He was a non-playing substitute when Kilkenny lost the 1999 All-Ireland final to Cork.

Honours

Erin's Own
Kilkenny Senior Football Championship: 2002, 2006
Kilkenny Intermediate Hurling Championship: 2003, 2008

Kilkenny 
Leinster Senior Hurling Championship: 1999
Leinster Under-21 Hurling Championship: 1995
All-Ireland Minor Hurling Championship: 1993
Leinster Minor Hurling Championship: 1993

References

1975 births
Living people
Erin's Own (Kilkenny) hurlers
Kilkenny inter-county hurlers